Hybrids  is a 1999 remix album by the Creatures (aka singer Siouxsie Sioux and percussionist Budgie). The tracks included are remixes of their songs released between 1998 and early 1999.

Most of the songs are extended mixes. Several mixes had been previously released on 12" promo singles and CD singles, but a large part of them were previously unreleased. Hybrids was released on both double-LP vinyl and CD.

The Independent on Sunday noted that all the remixes were created by other artists: "This is the pick of a crop that includes Howie B., Witchman and the Beloved, plus newer artists such as Icarus or Dr Psyche. While there are some chunky beats and catchy loops, it's better suited to home listening rather than the dancefloor".

Q Victoria Segal said: "So Howie B takes a knife to the sexually watchful 'Prettiest Thing'; Black Dog unbolt the beats of 'Guillotine' into disjunctive abstraction, and Witchman has his evil way with 'Say'. Twice. Running its finger along the cutting edge, Hybrids is a bravely bloody genetic experiment."

Track listing

UK CD (Duke D66 CDL) and US CD (INS-433-2)
"Prettiest Thing (Hormonal Mix)" by Howie B.
"Exterminating Angel (Nu Skool Mix)" by Dr Psyche
"Slipping Away (Tick Tock Mix)" by Chamber
"Say (Radio Friendly Mix)" by Witchman
"Pinned Down (By Icarus)" 
"Guillotine (Bitten by the Black Dog)" 
"All She Could Ask For (Dope mix)" by Justice & Endemic Void 
"2nd Floor (Strawberry Cocktail Mix)" by Vito Bonito
"Disconnected (Beloved in a Void)" by the Beloved 
"Turn It On (Black Smoker Mix)" by Omnivore
"Say (4 × 4 Mix)" by Witchman
"Prettiest Thing (Waking Dream Mix)" by Superchumbo

LP
"Disconnected (Beloved in a Void)"
"Exterminating Angel (Nu Skool Mix)"
"Slipping Away (Tick Tock Mix)"
"All She Could Ask For (Justice & Endemic's Void Dope Remix)"
"Pinned Down (By Icarus)"
"Guillotine (Bitten by the Black Dog)"
"Say (Very Long Mix)"
"Turn It On (Black Smoker Mix)"

Sources of the citations

1999 albums
The Creatures albums